Last Hero Standing is a 5-issue comic book limited series published by Marvel Comics in 2005. The series was written by Tom DeFalco and drawn by Pat Olliffe (who also co-plotted the series).

The series stars many characters from the MC2 universe, such as A-Next and the Fantastic Five. Although these characters existed prior to this miniseries, Marvel wished to reintroduce them to the public quickly following the success of Spider-Girl in digest size format. The series was released weekly and then reprinted as a trade paperback.

Plot summary
While "joy-hunting" together in Canada, Wild Thing is shocked when her father Wolverine is kidnapped in front of her eyes. Elsewhere across the world, one of the Ladyhawk sisters is abducted as well. These events get the attention of the Watcher Uatu.

After the first appearances of the original Fantastic Four, and the defeat of Loki which caused the creation of the first group of Avengers, a new line of heroes have emerged in a possible future timeline. These heroes now form the groups of A-Next and the Fantastic Five (F5), while other heroes such as Spider-Girl, the Green Goblin, and Darkdevil remain solo.

At the Avengers Compound, the headquarters of A-Next in the future, the young heroes are busy being trained by Captain America. At a local hospital, Iron Man has just visited a still comatose Scarlet Witch. After leaving her room, he hears noises in it, and when he re-enters it, she has been kidnapped as well.

At her home, young May "May Day" Parker, alias Spider-Girl, is busy taking care of her baby brother Ben, while being watched over by her parents Peter Parker and Mary Jane. After that, she leaves for school.

Meanwhile, the Thing of the F5 walks over the main streets of the city, when they suddenly start to crumble. Ben realizes he is in danger and sets off an alarm to alert his teammates.

Peter later discusses recent events with Phil Urich, alias Green Goblin. They are attacked by a gigantic robot which manages to abduct Peter. A panicking Phil contacts May about this. She, the Buzz, the other Ladyhawk and the Green Goblin dive into a tunnel that was created by the robot that kidnapped Peter. There, they meet up with all the members of A-Next who discovered the same tunnel earlier.

Meanwhile, somewhere else, an unconscious Peter is dragged by the robot into a dark realm.

An ancient Doctor Strange tries to gain the assistance of Doc Magus, but he prefers to work on his own. Doc Magus uses his astral form to scan the entire world for the missing heroes, which leads him to a dark cave. There, he is attacked by a dark entity that defeats and then kidnaps him as well.

At Avengers Compound, Captain America is exercising alone. Thunderstrike realizes Cap is feeling down because of his old age and promises him that he does not have to worry about it because A-Next will follow him anywhere. Cap and Thunderstrike are called to an A-Next meeting where they discuss possible villains who could be behind the kidnappings. They suspect: Kala, the Queen of the Underworld; Tyrannus, Master of the Subterraneans; Terrax the Tamer; the Living Lava Man; or Mole Man, the ruler of Monster Isle. They also inform the X-People of the situation, but Jubilee, their leader, decides that they work better on their own, causing J2 and Wild Thing to wonder why they ever bothered to try join the X-People; they are glad they decided to stay with A-Next. The team decides to split up to investigate the different possibilities.

At Barton's Dojo, American Dream and Freebooter discuss things with retired hero Hawkeye. Soon a crack in the ground is made and the heroes are kidnapped as well.

The Fantastic Five depart to Monster Isle, only to discover that the Mole Man is dead, and that a statue has been built in his honor.

Spider-Girl, Captain America and Thunderstrike learn about the kidnappings at Barton's Dojo. They jump into the hole together with J2 and Wild Thing. There, they discover a weird portal. After entering it, the heroes are immediately attacked by robot-like creatures and start to fight them. Soon the mastermind villain reveals himself to be Loki. He wants revenge on the Avengers, realizing he helped create them years earlier, and shows that he holds the missing heroes prisoner in life-size crystals.

Mary Jane fears for her husband's  safety. Spider-Man returns home, but he seems different, and his eyes have turned completely evil, causing MJ even more fear.

Spider-Girl and the other heroes are still being attacked by the robot-like creatures. Cap and Thunderstrike are defeated and kidnapped, and Spider-Girl suggests she and J2 retreat while they can.

Meanwhile, in the city, Spider-Man confronts DarkDevil the hero he dislikes most. The two fight each other.

The Vision returns to the Avengers Compound where he finds Stinger discussing matters with Jubilee, who promises to contact them when she learns anything new. The Vision explains that he has arrived at the request of the President of the United States, G. W. Bridge, who believes that the kidnappings could threaten the nation. Jarvis arrives suddenly to inform the two that all of the missing heroes have mysteriously returned. Jarvis also alerts them to the Spider-Man/DarkDevil battle in midtown.

Captain America, Wild Thing and Thunderstrike are put in chains. Elsewhere in the caves, Loki manages to kidnap Nova as well. Loki injects Nova with a dark mist, which causes him to become evil and to side with him.

J2 and Spider-Girl return to the caves and set their teammates free. They later find Nova captured in the same crystals as before and set him free as well. Meanwhile, Loki has set up two sides of heroes against each other: the ones he kidnapped and turned evil against the unaffected heroes.

The heroes begin fighting each other: the Human Torch fights the Hulk, and his flames reveal some robotic body parts covering the Hulk. Hulk manages to defeat the Human Torch by throwing water over him. The Hulk is almost taken down by Psi-Lord and the other F5. Hulk still feels angry about being called "Banner" and Loki uses his magical influences to make the Hulk even angrier.

The Hulk uses his gigantic fists to punch the ground, which creates an earthquake throughout the city, destroying some buildings and, at the same time, defeating the F5. While some other heroes are injured along the way as well and are taken care off by medical staff, the others worry about what to do.

In Asgard, Thor and Captain America try to figure out what is wrong with the heroes. Discouraged and concerned about his performance, Cap determines he should limit his role in the matter.

Elsewhere in Thor's castle, the Vizier notices that Nova is acting strangely and senses that Nova has been turned evil. He uses his magic spells to bring Nova back to normal and plans to do the same with the other Earth heroes. Nova also remembers what happened to him and reveals to his teammates that Loki is behind everything.

Together, the Thing and Wolverine are battling the heroes, but Wolverine is stopped by Stinger and the Hulk. Thor transports himself and the others on Asgard back to Earth to confront the Hulk and the "evil" heroes.

Meanwhile, Spider-Girl's spider-sense warns her of a mysterious presence which she cannot see. Dormagus and the Vizier use their combined magic powers to make Loki reveal himself, and the heroes all fight each other. Captain America notices a gem hanging on Loki's neck, and smashes it with his shield. Loki apparently used this gem to help him turn the heroes evil. Once the gem is destroyed, the heroes, including the Hulk, revert to normal.

A furious Loki releases a deadly blast against Captain America, injuring him. Thor releases a blast from his hammer which will send Loki into Limbo forever and the Hulk decides to join him to make sure that Loki remains there.

Captain America dies, and Thor uses his hammer to grant Cap's soul immortality. The soul floats into the skies, and creates a shiny bright star in the form of Cap's shield, meant to inspire the heroes and future generations to come always.

Collected editions
The limited series has been collected in a trade paperback:

Last Hero Standing (120 pages, October 2005)

Implications
The kidnapping of Wolverine was first seen at the end of Spider-Girl #85 and repeated in the opening page of Last Hero Standing #1.
The limited series reveals that Mole Man is dead in the MC2 Universe.

Aftermath
This miniseries has two sequels:
In Spider-Girl #94–95, Ant-Man, Hawkeye, Vision and Scarlet Witch return to active duty and join A-Next.
A follow-up limited series, Last Planet Standing, was published the following year.

References

Marvel Comics 2